The following is the list of players in the AFL Women's (AFLW) who made their AFLW debut during the 2017 AFL Women's season.

Summary

Debuts

References

Australian rules football records and statistics
Australian rules football-related lists
Debut